Maria Augimeri (born ) is a Canadian politician. From 1985 to 2018, she served as a local politician in Toronto, holding office as a school board trustee, and as a council member in North York, Metropolitan Toronto, and on Toronto City Council. In 2019, Augimeri stood as the New Democratic candidate for the riding of Humber River-Black Creek.

Background
Born in Italy, Augimeri moved to Canada with her family at the age of 2.  Before entering politics, she was a Social Anthropologist at York University. She has written three books on the Italian-Canadian community and is also a published poet.

Politics
She first entered politics as a school trustee, and was elected to the city council of North York in 1985. She ran for the Ontario New Democratic Party in the 1987 provincial election in the riding of Downsview which her husband, Odoardo Di Santo, held for ten years before losing in the 1985 election.  She lost to Liberal Laureano Leone by 174 votes.

Augimeri was elected to the Metro Toronto council in 1988, and remained on that council until the creation of the new city of Toronto in 1997.  She was elected councillor to the new city council three times.  She was known for promoting environmental awareness and cultural issues.

She was endorsed for re-election by the Toronto Star newspaper in 2003.

The local weekly newspaper Now Magazine also gave her an endorsement in 2000.

On August 10, 2008, a massive propane explosion in Augimeri's ward destroyed a propane distribution facility which caused the evacuation of thousands of residents. Augimeri cut short a summer vacation in Italy and returned to Toronto to assist with the situation. During a press conference, she became involved in a heated discussion with Tony Di Santo, head of the local ratepayer's group. She said, "If people have problems of a partisan nature they should not be using the death of a firefighter... So shut up!" Later she apologized for losing her temper, "letting my anger" (get in the way) in her words.

2010 municipal election
The 2010 Toronto municipal election was held on October 25. Augimeri won by an 89-vote margin (0.7%) over local businessman Gus Cusimano. Augimeri thanked her supporters the following day on October 26, 2010, when she said, "I know a lot of the community voted for me because they know I'm the one to protect community interests."

Cusimano later announced that he would challenge the results. The matter was heard in court on March 29, 2011. The judge ruled that there were enough irregularities in the 2010 voting that the election should be held again. Initially the city's legal staff said they would be appealing the decision but on May 13 it was announced that the city would not launch an appeal. City Clerk Uli Watkiss said in a statement, "The decision to proceed with a by-election and resolve this matter as quickly as possible is in the best interest of the public, the individuals directly affected, and the workings of Council." The mayor's office supported the decision. Rob Ford's press secretary Adrienne Batra said, "Obviously the mayor supported (Cusimano) during the general election and once the byelection gets under way he will be fully supporting him again."

On May 16, Augimeri announced that she would be appealing the decision herself. Augimeri told media, "The clerk’s advice not to appeal does harm to taxpayers as well as to the integrity of our electoral system." On August 4, the city reversed its decision and decided to join the appeal which was held in September 2011. On December 19, the court ruled in Augimeri's favour. A three judge panel ruled that although 300 ballots were unsigned by electoral officers the people voting were very likely eligible to vote and that this would have no effect on the election. In a related judgement, they also ruled that Cusimano incorrectly voted in the Ward 9 election because he lived in another riding. They decided that no further action was necessary.

Augimeri was appointed Chair of the Toronto Transit Commission in February 2014 upon the resignation of Karen Stintz to run for Mayor of Toronto in the 2014 Toronto election winning appointment over Josh Colle, Stintz's preferred successor.

2014 municipal election

In the 2014 election, Augimeri again faced Cusimano, though defeated him by a larger margin (42.74% to 28.37%).

2018 Municipal Election

Following the election of Augimeri's former council colleague Doug Ford as Premier of Ontario, Ford's Progressive Conservative government passed legislation that reduced the number of seats on Toronto City Council from 47 to 25 immediately before the city's scheduled election. The legislation, referred to as the Better Local Government Act, merged wards being contested by Augimeri and another council colleague, James Pasternak. Augimeri lost to Pasternak by over 2000 votes, blaming the reduction in council seats for her loss and noting that she would have won in her old ward.

Augimeri served as the chairperson of the Toronto and Region Conservation Authority (TRCA) Board of Directors until February 2019. In July 2019, Augimeri was replaced on the TRCA by a citizen appointee.

2019 Federal Election

In the October 21, 2019 Federal Election, Maria Augimeri was unable to unseat the long time Liberal incumbent in the Humber River-Black Creek riding, Judy Sgro. Ms. Sgro won with 22,983 votes, Ms. Augimeri with the NDP was a distant second  at 7,126.

Election results

Federal

Provincial

Municipal

|- style="background-color:#fcfcfc;"
!rowspan="2" colspan="2" style="text-align:center;" |Candidate
!colspan="3" style="text-align:center;" |Popular vote
!rowspan="2" colspan="2" style="text-align:center;" |Expenditures
|- style="background-color:#fcfcfc;"
| style="text-align:center;" | Votes
| style="text-align:center;" |%
| style="text-align:center;" |±%
|-
| style="background-color:#1406a8;" |
| style="text-align:left;" | James Pasternak (Incumbent)
| style="text-align:right;" |11,559
| style="text-align:right;" |47.61%
| style="text-align:right;" |-57.78%
| style="text-align:right;" |$67,212.21
|-
| style="background-color:#FF7F00;" |
| style="text-align:left;" | Maria Augimeri (Incumbent)
| style="text-align:right;" |9,223
| style="text-align:right;" |37.99%
| style="text-align:right;" |-4.75%
| style="text-align:right;" |$66,209.39
|-
| style="background-color:#FF0000;" |
| style="text-align:left;" | Louise Russo
| style="text-align:right;" |2,726
| style="text-align:right;" |11.23%
| style="text-align:right;" | -
| style="text-align:right;" |$23,323.98
|-
| style="background-color:#b70776;" |
| style="text-align:left;" | Edward Zaretsky 
| style="text-align:right;" |771
| style="text-align:right;" |3.17
| style="text-align:right;" | -
| style="text-align:right;" | -1
|-
| style="text-align:right;background-color:#FFFFFF;" colspan="2" |Total votes
| style="text-align:right;background-color:#FFFFFF;" |24,279
| style="text-align:right;background-color:#FFFFFF;" |
| style="text-align:right;background-color:#FFFFFF;" |
| style="text-align:right;" |
|- 
| style="text-align:right;background-color:#FFFFFF;" colspan="2" |Registered voters
| style="text-align:right;background-color:#FFFFFF;" |
| style="text-align:right;background-color:#FFFFFF;" |
| style="text-align:right;background-color:#FFFFFF;" |
| style="text-align:right;" |
|- 
| style="text-align:left;" colspan="6" |1 These candidates did not submit official Financial Statements and are, therefore, ineligible to run in the  2022 Municipal election Note: All Toronto Municipal Elections are officially non-partisan.  Note: Candidate campaign colours are based on the prominent colour used in campaign items (signs, literature, etc.)and are used as a visual differentiation between candidates.
|- 
| style="text-align:left;" colspan="13" |Sources: City of Toronto, "Election Results"
|}

Works
 Italian-Canadians, a cross section. 1978. National Congress of Italian-Canadians. Ottawa.
 Calabrese folklore. 1985. National Museums of Canada. Ottawa.

Notes

References

External links
 
 

Italian emigrants to Canada
Toronto city councillors
Metropolitan Toronto councillors
Living people
Women municipal councillors in Canada
Women in Ontario politics
Place of birth missing (living people)
Chairs of the Toronto Transit Commission
20th-century Canadian politicians
20th-century Canadian women politicians
21st-century Canadian politicians
21st-century Canadian women politicians
1954 births